Mayesville Historic District is a national historic district located at Mayesville, Sumter County, South Carolina.  It encompasses 62 contributing buildings in the western half of the town of Mayesville.  It includes a broad range of late-19th and early-20th century vernacular architectural design, including commercial, residential (majority), and religious buildings. The district includes representative examples of the Neo-Classical, Victorian, Queen Anne, Colonial Revival, Greek Revival, and Bungalow. Notable buildings include the Town Hall, Kineen Hotel, Bland Stables, Granit Building, Davis Store, J. W. Rhodes House, and R. J. Mayes House.

It was added to the National Register of Historic Places in 1979.

References

Historic districts on the National Register of Historic Places in South Carolina
Greek Revival architecture in South Carolina
Neoclassical architecture in South Carolina
Colonial Revival architecture in South Carolina
Victorian architecture in South Carolina
Queen Anne architecture in South Carolina
Buildings and structures in Sumter County, South Carolina
National Register of Historic Places in Sumter County, South Carolina